Xenocrasis anamarcelae  is a species of beetle in the family Cerambycidae. It was described by Tavakilian and Penaherrera-Leiva in 2003.

References

Rhinotragini
Beetles described in 2003